The Germany women's national under-19 football team represents the female under-19s of Germany in the UEFA Women's Under-19 Championship, and is controlled by the German Football Association.

History

Change of U-18 to U-19

The first four tournaments of the UEFA Women's Under-19 Championship were in the U-18 category. In 2001, the German Football Association decided to change the age limit from the U-18 team to U-19.  The move was in preparation for 2002 UEFA Women's Under-19 Championship (competition that served as a qualifying tournament for the 2002 FIFA U-19 Women's World Championship).

Results

UEFA Women's Under-19 Championship

The German team has participated in the UEFA Women's Under-19 Championship 20 times; Winning it six times and setting the record for more titles.

Players
Squad for 2017 UEFA Women's Under-19 Championship qualification in Germany

Caps and goals as of 04 April 2017.

Head coach: Maren Meinert

See also
 Germany women's national football team
 Germany women's national under-20 football team
 Germany women's national under-17 football team
 FIFA U-20 Women's World Cup
 UEFA Women's Under-19 Championship

References

External links
 Site of the Under-19 national team at the German Football Association 
 UEFA Women's Under-19 Championship

 

Youth football in Germany
Women's national under-19 association football teams
Football